The Memorial Primo Nebiolo is an annual track and field meeting held at the Stadio Primo Nebiolo in Turin, Italy in early June.

History
The history of the Turin competition dates back to 1963, when the Torino Meeting was first held. This event hosted top level athletes, such as Sebastian Coe and Saïd Aouita, for two decades until its cancellation in 1983. A re-boot occurred in 1995 with the launch of the Meeting Internazionale di Atletica Leggera Città di Torino and it quickly became part of the IAAF Grand Prix circuit. Following the death of the highly influential Italian sports administrator Primo Nebiolo (a former IAAF President who was born in the city), the competition was renamed in his honour in 2000 as the Memorial Primo Nebiolo.

The meeting is currently part of the European Athletics Outdoor Premium Meetings series.

Meet records

Men

Women

References

External links
Official website
Meeting records

European Athletic Association meetings
IAAF Grand Prix
Sports competitions in Turin
Athletics competitions in Italy
Recurring sporting events established in 1995
1995 establishments in Italy
Summer events in Italy
IAAF World Outdoor Meetings